Thapelo is a unisex given name (meaning "prayer") of southern African origin that may refer to:

Thapelo Ketlogetswe (born 1991), Botswana sprinter
Thapelo Kotlhai (born 1989), South African music artist, tv and radio producer
Thapelo Matsheka
Thapelo Mokhele (born 1986), footballer from Lesotho
Thapelo Mokoena (born 1982), South African actor and television presenter
Thapelo Morena (born 1993), South African Footballer

Thapelo Phora (born 1991), South African sprinter
Thapelo Tale (born 1988), footballer from Lesotho
Thapelo Tshilo (born 1985), South African footballer